Gruszków may refer to the following places in Poland:
Gruszków, Lower Silesian Voivodeship (south-west Poland)
Gruszków, Greater Poland Voivodeship (west-central Poland)